Connaught Motor Company was a manufacturer of high-performance hybrid technology cars and one of the first companies in the world to use this technology. Starting as a pioneer in lightweight technologies and power electronics, the company was relaunched in 2006 as a hybrid car manufacturer; it built five prototype vehicles, including the Connaught Type D Hybrid and Connaught Type D Syracuse that emulated the former glory years of car-making. 
After the company closed in 2014, several engines and chassis were made for these original vehicles that are still in circulation today.

Connaught's early concept sketches were designed by Andy Plumb, with the delivery of the concept implemented by lead designer Geoff Matthews. 

Connaught Motor Company was the sister company of the engineering company Connaught Engineering, which was formed to exploit the hybrid technology and create a successful set of retrofit hybrid systems for commercial vehicles.

Dissolution 
In the financial crisis of 2008, the Welsh Government and Connaught's creditor banks failed to meet their commitments to the business, and the level of investment needed to industrialize the company failed to materialize. This was in stark contrast to Tesla of the United States, who were behind Connaught in the race to production stage but received significant state funding throughout the recession.

in 2014, Tim Bishop, one of the founders of Connaught, failed to relaunch the company. 
Freedy Page-Roberts, the company's original backer, also launched a small start-up company into the aggressive electronic vehicle marketplace, no doubt based on his experiences in Connaught. 

The company is not to be confused with a business that has used the brand for second-hand cars and was fined for selling its cars without a street trading licence.

References

External links 

Connaught Motor Company

Car manufacturers of the United Kingdom
Luxury motor vehicle manufacturers
Llanelli